Norlin is a surname. Notable people with the surname include:

Ann-Marie Norlin (born 1979), Swedish footballer
Annika Norlin (born 1977), Swedish pop artist
George Norlin (1871–1942), American university president
Per Norlin (1905–1992), Swedish businessman
Tempest-Marie Norlin (born 1991), Swedish footballer